Oona Parviainen (born 5 September 1977) is a Finnish retired ice hockey player. She played with the Finnish national team during 2001 to 2006 and competed in the women's ice hockey tournaments at the 2002 Winter Olympics and the 2006 Winter Olympics and at the 2005 IIHF Women's World Championship.

Parviainen announced her retirement at age 43, following the 2020–21 Naisten Liiga season, during which she was an alternate captain of Rovaniemen Kiekko (RoKi). Her club career comprised 21 seasons in the Finnish women's leagues, with the Espoo Blues, KalPa, and RoKi, and included nine Finnish Championship titles.

References

External links
 
 
 

1977 births
Living people
People from Kuopio
Finnish women's ice hockey forwards
RoKi Naiset players
Espoo Blues Naiset players
KalPa Naiset players
Ice hockey players at the 2002 Winter Olympics
Ice hockey players at the 2006 Winter Olympics
Olympic ice hockey players of Finland
Sportspeople from North Savo